The 2003 Gerry Weber Open was a men's tennis tournament played on grass courts at the Gerry Weber Stadion in Halle, North Rhine-Westphalia in Germany that was part of the International Series of the 2003 ATP Tour. It was the 11th edition of the tournament and was held from 9 June until 15 June 2003. First-seeded Roger Federer won the singles title.

Finals

Singles

 Roger Federer defeated  Nicolas Kiefer 6–1, 6–3
 It was Federer's 4th singles title of the year and the 8th of his career.

Doubles

 Jonas Björkman /  Todd Woodbridge defeated  Martin Damm /  Cyril Suk 6–3, 6–4
 It was Björkman's 1st title of the year and the 35th of his career. It was Woodbridge's 1st title of the year and the 77th of his career.

References

External links
 Official website 
 ATP tournament profile
 ITF tournament edition details

 
Gerry Weber Open
Halle Open
2003 in German tennis